Hubali-Dharwad BRTS (HDBRTS) is a bus rapid transit system built to serve the twin cities of Hubali and Dharwad, located in the North-Western part of Karnataka state in India. Hubali-Dharwad BRTS (HDBRTS) project is a Government of Karnataka initiative to foster long-term economic growth in the region. The project promotes fast, safe, comfortable, convenient and affordable public transportation between the twin cities and aims to reduce congestion and air pollution in the region.

The  dedicated BRT corridor with holistic BRT components connect Hubali and Dharwad. This system will not only transport 1.75 lakh daily passengers currently using the buses on this corridor but also provide safe, sustainable & efficient alternative for the private vehicle users travelling on this corridor.

The Hubali-Dharwad BRTS project is implemented as part of the Sustainable Urban Transport Project (SUTP) and funded by the Government of Karnataka, Ministry of Housing and Urban Affairs (MHUA), World Bank and Global Environment Facility (GEF). The total cost of the project is ₹970.87 Cr.

Hubali-Dharwad BRTS Company Limited 
The Hubali-Dharwad BRTS Company Ltd, a special purpose vehicle (SPV), is the nodal agency that implemented the BRT System. The company is headed by managing director. There are four Deputy General Managers (Admin, Finance, Infrastructure, and Operations & ITS) and a Chief Security Officer.

Board of Directors 
 Commissioner, Directorate of Urban Land Transport, Government of Karnataka - chairman of the board.
 Deputy Commissioner, Dharwad
 Managing Director, NWKRTC
 Managing Director, KRDCL
 Managing Director, HDBRTS
 Commissioner of Police, Hubali-Dharwad Police
 Additional Commissioner, Department of Transport & Enf, North Zone, Dharwad
 Commissioner, HDMC
 Commissioner, HDUDA
 Chief Engineer, PWD, CAB, North Zone, Dharwad

BRT corridor 
The BRTS corridor includes segregated bus lanes, access-controlled bus stations, physical and fare integration with BRT feeder services, off-board ticketing through smart cards and bar-coded paper tickets, intelligent transport system and high-quality buses (Standard AC buses). The corridor is designed for operating regular and express services. It consists of two lanes for BRTS buses on either side of the median bus station facilitating overtaking lanes for express services. Foot overbridges at six locations, PELICAN signals, and synchronized signal management are proposed to facilitate easy approach of passengers to bus stations.

Bus stations 
32 stations of the highest quality have been constructed on the median along the BRTS corridor. Based on the passenger load and interchange opportunity, there are seven three-bay bus stations and 24 two-bay bus stations.

Supporting infrastructure 
 BRTS Depot, Hubballi
 BRTS Terminal, Hubballi
 Old Bus Station, Dharwad
 Central Workshop, Dharwad
 BRTS Terminal, Dharwad
 Interchange at Hosur

Intelligent Transportation System (ITS) 
 Automated Vehicle Location (AVL) system provides tracking and operations management of buses using GPS based vehicle tracking system. Information on real time location of buses allows dissemination of estimated time of arrival and departure, which enhances customer experience.
 Automated Fare Collection System (AFCS) is primarily to cater the fare collection needs of the BRT buses, feeder services and the city buses in Hubballi and Dharwad cities. As part of AFCS, the stations have Fare Gates similar to Metro Rail systems for off-board ticketing.
 Platform screen doors (PSD): One of a kind half height platform screen doors for proper air circulation. The Platform sliding doors works based on the RFID technology. The doors only open after the docking of the buses.
Passenger Information System (PIS) consists of multiple ways of sharing next bus arrival information with commuters. This includes Display Boards, IVRS, SMS, Mobile App and Commuter Portal. The commuters can easily manage their trip details, smart card recharge using the mobile app and website.
Incident Management System (IMS) to reduce response time, monitor key areas and to ensure effectiveness of BRT services. It includes the ANPR system to maintain discipline and enforce the non-BRT vehicles using the BRT corridor. CCTV cameras, Video wall, Network management system, fault monitoring system are all included in the Incident Management Systems.
Transit Management System (TMS) consisting of: Schedule & Crew Management; Depot & Terminal Management Systems; Workshop Management Systems; Inventory/Asset Management Systems; Human Resources; Finance consisting of Payroll, Accounts Receivable, General Ledger, etc.; and Customer Feedback. This is one of the modern and integrated Transit Management System which is not available with other transit agencies in India.
City Mobility Centre (CMC) is the control centre/transit management centre for the project operations. In the single location all systems can be accessed, and decisions can be made.
Adaptive Traffic Control System (ATCS) with bus priority phasing is implemented for the 1st time for BRT in India. This system work on the real time vehicle demand on the respective arm of the junction. The system uses data from vehicle detectors installed in each arm of the junction and optimize traffic signal settings to reduce vehicle delays and stops.

Buses 

One hundred "Chigari" (ಚಿಗರಿ, which means "Black buck" in Kannada), custom-built buses with violet livery, made by UD Trucks, buses division (a subsidiary of Isuzu, Japan), form the fleet of the Hubballi-Dharwad BRTS Company. HDBRTS system is the best of its kind in India, with premium 12 m AC buses to ensure passenger comfort and safety at an affordable rate. The BRT buses are BS-IV compliant, meeting UBS-II specifications, with a provision for wheelchair and baby pram. The buses are facilitated with on-board ITS for real-time passenger information, CCTV surveillance for safety and an announcement system. The bus has seating capacity of 37 + 1 with reservation for ladies (12), senior citizens (2) and specially-abled (2).

Routes

Timing 
The BRTS buses run from morning 6 am to 12 midnight. The duty hours of the ticket-issuing staff at the BRTS stations ends at 10 pm, after which, i.e., up to midnight, the passengers have to get the ticket from the conductor in the bus itself.

Frequency

Feeder Buses 
HDBRTS and NWKRTC started BRTS feeder buses named 'Chigari Samparka' on 16th December 2022. On a pilot basis, NWKRTC has started operating feeder buses between Sutagatti and Navanagar.

Feeder Bus Routes

Project Status 
HDBRTS commenced trial runs on 2 October 2018. The first trial run was initiated over an 8 km stretch between Hubballi Railway Station and Srinagar. The trial runs were slowly extended over the 20 km stretch between Hubballi and Dharwad. Different types of services were introduced during the trial run, like all-stops, limited-stops and non-stop. Over time, the fleet size was increased and HDBRTS currently operates a fleet of 100 buses with approximately 1,240 trips per day. Approximately 100,000 passengers travel with HDBRTS every day. The "Chigari" buses operate in "limited-stop" and "all-stop" modes. The travel time for "limited-stop" services is 35 minutes and for "all-stop" services is 55 minutes. Smart Card, Web-portal and Mobile Application were launched on 10.01.2020.

Green BRTS 
Green BRTS is an initiative of the Hubballi Dharwad BRTS Company Ltd., as a part of which, tree saplings are planted at various locations in Hubballi and Dharwad. The Hubballi Dharwad BRTS Company Ltd. has planted approximately 27,500 saplings over a period of 5 years in the premises of government offices, schools, colleges and eco-parks. Approximately 5,000 saplings have been planted along the HDBRTS corridor. An initiative to map the plantation under Green BRTS was started in June 2016 by the Directorate of Urban Land Transport and Hubballi Dharwad BRTS Company Ltd. This mapping initiative supports an online public platform for intimating to the govt./ ascertaining by the government the status of the plantation. This will also help in analyzing growth, survival rate, etc., of the trees at different stages. Also, effective selection of locations and species, maintenance schedule, etc., with public participation are the further plans.

Awards 

 "Award of Excellence-2019" under "Best Urban Mass Transit Project" by Ministry of Housing and Urban Affairs, Government of India.

References 
feasiR bility report
KRDCL
current status report
land acquisition report

External links 
 Center for Excellence in Urban Transport (CoE), CEPT University, Ahmedabad
 KRDCL
 NWKRTC
 Govt. of Karnataka

Transport in Hubli-Dharwad
Road transport in Dharwad
Proposed bus rapid transit in India
2018 establishments in Karnataka